Rosemund Dienye Green-Osahogulu (born 12 April 1956) is a Vice-Chancellor of Ignatius Ajuru University of Education that is based in Rumuolumeni Port Harcourt, Rivers State in Nigeria.

Green-Osahogulu was born in the Kingdom of Bonny in 1956. She was the first Vice-Chancellor of Ignatius Ajuru University of Education that is based in Rumuolumeni Port Harcourt, Rivers State in Nigeria. Her appointment was made by the state governor Chibuike Rotimi Amaechi in October 2013.

References

1956 births
Living people
Vice-Chancellors of Nigerian universities